Daytona (stylized in all caps) is the third studio album by American rapper Pusha T. It was released on May 25, 2018, by G.O.O.D. Music and Def Jam Recordings. The album features guest appearances from Rick Ross and Kanye West, and uncredited additional vocals by Tony Williams and 070 Shake. Kanye West also served as executive producer and produced all of its tracks, with additional production from Andrew Dawson and Mike Dean.

Daytona is the first of five albums produced by West in Jackson Hole, Wyoming, in what became known as the "Wyoming Sessions", released in 2018, with a seven-track album being released every week. The album preceded the release of West's eighth studio album Ye, West's collaboration with Kid Cudi titled Kids See Ghosts, Nas' eleventh studio album Nasir, and Teyana Taylor's second studio album K.T.S.E..

Daytona was supported by the lead single, "What Would Meek Do?", which was released from the album on July 4, 2018. Daytona debuted at number three on the US Billboard 200 with 77,000 album-equivalent units, of which 39,000 were pure album sales. The album received widespread critical acclaim from music critics and was considered by many major publications to be one of the best albums of 2018 and the decade. The album received a nomination for Best Rap Album at the 2019 Grammy Awards.

Background
In December 2015, Pusha T released the album King Push – Darkest Before Dawn: The Prelude, which was set to serve as a prelude to Pusha T's third album, King Push. However, the album suffered from numerous delays, and instead, Daytona was announced by Kanye West via Twitter on April 19, 2018, alongside the album's release date.

Pusha T explained the title of the album by stating: "I changed the album title from King Push to Daytona because I felt it didn’t represent the overall message of this body of work. Daytona represents the fact that I have the luxury of time. That luxury only comes when you have a skill set that you're confident in."

Recording and production
Recording sessions for the album took place in Jackson, Wyoming and Utah during 2017 up to May 2018. Initial production for the album featured a variety of high profiled producers, however the original material was scrapped in favour of Kanye West producing the entire album. Production influences came from creating individual song lists and sampling. The album contained ten unique samples across its seven tracks, making it the most-sample dense project to come out of the Wyoming Sessions.

Songs recorded for the album include "Sociopath" featuring guest vocals from Kanye West and Kash Doll. "Sociopath" leaked in April 2019 and was later officially released as a single in August 2019, along with "Coming Home", which features Lauryn Hill, which was also rumoured to be intended for Daytona.

The album was officially completed on May 23, 2018, two days before digital release.

Artwork
The original artwork for Daytona was replaced a few days before the album's release, with the official artwork showing a picture of now-deceased singer Whitney Houston's drug paraphernalia-littered bathroom. The licensing for the artwork cost $85,000, paid by Kanye West. Houston's ex-husband Bobby Brown criticized the cover, saying it was in "really really bad taste".

Controversy
Canadian rapper Drake responded to the song "Infrared", which addressed Drake and his ghostwriting rumors, by releasing a diss track titled "Duppy Freestyle" on May 25, 2018, which heavily sampled "Ever So Lovingly" by Táta Vega. The song garnered significant media attention, as well as a response from Pusha T on Twitter. Four days later, Pusha T responded with his own song titled "The Story of Adidon" which alleges that Drake is secretly the father of a porn star's child. Drake would later go on to confirm this on his own album, Scorpion, a few weeks later. Drake alleges that the child information was leaked by West, but Pusha T alleges that Drake's producer, 40, leaked the info to a woman he slept with.

Critical reception

Daytona received widespread acclaim from critics. At Metacritic, which assigns a normalized rating out of 100 to reviews from mainstream publications, the album received an average score of 86 based on 22 reviews, indicating "universal acclaim". Paul A. Thompson of Pitchfork described the album "a near-airtight exercise in flair and focus", stating that "it shirks the bloat and radio concessions of Darkest Before Dawn and, to a greater extent, his 2013 debut album, My Name Is My Name. The beats – sample-heavy and produced entirely by Kanye – are uniformly excellent and let you see the seams: It's like an album full of "Bound 2"'s, without the sentimentality", concluding that the album is "Pusha's best work as a solo artist". Ben Beaumont-Thomas of The Guardian stated that "Each track is an elocution lesson, his bars enunciated with the almost pedantic menace of a bad cop explaining what he plans to do to you", describing the lyricism as "crisply brilliant drug poetry" and commending the production. Yoh Phillips of DJBooth wrote that Daytona "puts on display a maximized portrait of potent potential realized. After knocking at this door for years, Pusha has finally made an undeniable breakthrough. His words are razor sharp, his lyricism blessed by the kind of beats that allow him a beautiful ring to box in."

Clayton Purdom of The A.V. Club expressed that Daytona is "an absolute masterpiece of minimalism", complimenting both the album's production and lyricism. Kyle Mullin of Exclaim! stated that the album "boasts a mostly sinewy and understated sound that'll leave hip-hop heads in revelry". Online hip hop publication HipHopDX wrote that Daytona provides "a fitting backdrop for some of the most grim, relentlessly murderous raps Pusha has ever rhymed", also crediting West's production and the album's run time.

Daytona was ranked the 18th best release of the year in The Wire magazine's annual critics' poll. Uproxx cited the album as one of the best rap releases of 2018. Complex magazine named Daytona the number 1 album of the year. He was also named Best Rapper Alive in 2018 by Complex for his work on the album Daytona. In 2019, Pitchfork ranked Daytona at number 188 in their list of "The 200 Best Albums of the 2010s"; staff writer Alphonse Pierre wrote: "Daytona is the full realization of Pusha as a star...for all the storylines and drama that surrounded Daytona, the music rises above."

Accolades
In 2019, NME named it the 82nd best album of the 2010s decade. Rolling Stone  listed it 74th in its top 100 albums of the decade list.  Pitchfork listed it 188 on their top 200 albums of the decade. Paste named it the 18th best Hip-Hop album of the 2010s.

Track listing

Notes
  signifies a co-producer
  signifies an additional producer
 "Hard Piano" and "Santeria" feature additional vocals by Tony Williams
 "Santeria" features additional vocals by 070 Shake

Samples
 "If You Know You Know" contains a sample of the recording "Twelve O'Clock Satanial" performed by Air and written by Al Gwylit and Richard Nisbet.
 "The Games We Play" contains a sample of "Heart 'N Soul", written and performed by Booker T. Averheart; and an interpolation of "Politics as Usual", written by Cynthia Biggs, Shawn Carter, Dexter Wansel and David Anthony Willis, and performed by Jay-Z.
 "Come Back Baby" contains samples of "The Truth Shall Make You Free", written and performed by The Mighty Hannibal; and samples of "I Can't Do Without You", written and performed by George Jackson.
 "Santeria" contains a sample of "Bumpy's Lament", written by Issac Hayes, and performed by Soul Mann & The Brothers.
 "What Would Meek Do?" contains a sample of the Yes recording "Heart of the Sunrise", written by Jon Anderson, Christopher Squire and William Bruford, and performed by Yes.
 "Infrared" contains a sample of the recording "I Want to Make Up", written by Robert Manchurian, and performed by 24-Carat Black; and an interpolation of "The Prelude", written by Shawn Carter and Mark James; and performed by Jay-Z.

Personnel
 Tom Kahre – recording
 Nathaniel Alford – recording
 Jenna Felsenthal – recording assistance
 Mike Snell – recording 
 Mike Dean – engineering, mixing, keyboards , mastering
 Sean Solymar – assistant engineering
 Noah Goldstein – engineering, programming 
 Andrew Dawson – engineering 
 Mike Malchicoff – engineering 
 Jess Jackson – mixing
 Splash News – cover
 Akeem Smith (The Projects) – cover design

Charts

Weekly charts

Year-end charts

References

External links

2018 albums
Albums produced by Kanye West
Albums produced by Mike Dean (record producer)
Albums produced by Pi'erre Bourne
Def Jam Recordings albums
GOOD Music albums
Pusha T albums